"Lady" is a song recorded by Jamaican singer Wayne Wade. The song was a top 40 hit in Sweden, peaking at No. 26. In the Netherlands and Belgium it was a top ten hit, peaking at No. 5 and No. 9, respectively.

Track listing and formats 

 Dutch 7-inch single

A. "Lady" – 3:45
B. "Breezin'" – 3:35

 UK 12-inch single

A. "Lady" – 6:46
B. "Breezin'" – 3:35

Credits and personnel 

 Wayne Wade – vocals
 Lionel Richie – songwriter
 Paul Khouri – producer
 Willie Lindo – producer

Credits and personnel adapted from the 7-inch single liner notes.

Charts

Weekly charts

Year-end charts

References 

1982 songs
1982 singles
Ariola Records singles
Songs written by Lionel Richie
Wayne Wade songs